Croceitalea is a genus in the phylum Bacteroidota (Bacteria).

Etymology
The name Croceitalea derives from:Latin adjective croceus, saffron-coloured, yellow, golden; Latin feminine gender noun talea, a slender staff, rod, stick; New Latin feminine gender noun Croceitalea, a rod forming yellow-orange colonies.

Species
The genus contains 2 species (including basonyms and synonyms), namely
 C. dokdonensis ( Lee et al. 2008,  (Type species of the genus).; New Latin feminine gender adjective dokdonensis, pertaining to Dokdo, the Korean island from where the type strain was isolated.)
 C. eckloniae ( Lee et al. 2008,  (Type species of the genus).; New Latin feminine gender noun Ecklonia, scientific genus name of a marine alga; New Latin genitive case noun eckloniae, of Ecklonia, referring to the isolation of the type strain from Ecklonia kurome.)
 C. litorea (Kim et al. 2015)
 C. marina (Su et al. 2017)

See also
 Bacterial taxonomy
 Microbiology

References 

Bacteria genera
Flavobacteria